Rich Whitney (born April 21, 1955) is an American politician and civil rights attorney who was the Illinois Green Party's nominee for Governor of Illinois in the elections of 2006 and 2010.  During the 2006 campaign Whitney received endorsements from several newspapers, including the Rockford Register Star, Southwest News-Herald, and State School News Service. In that year's election Whitney received 361,336 votes for 10.4% of the vote, a strong finish for a third party. In the 2010 election his share of the vote was 2.7%.

Personal history
Whitney was born in Connecticut in 1955 and lives in Carbondale, Illinois. He is a civil rights attorney with degrees from Michigan State University and Southern Illinois University's School of Law.  He was a member of the Socialist Labor Party from 1975–1993 and at one point edited "The People," the party's national newspaper. He resigned from the party in 1993 and no longer identifies with socialism.
Whitney was involved in nationwide legal battles to regulate tobacco advertising, on behalf of the public health community, including the American Medical Association, the American Cancer Society, the American Lung Association and Public Citizen. Whitney also is one of the founding members of the Illinois Green Party and wrote a significant portion of the Party's platform. In July 2021, Whitney resigned from the Green Party due to "a mob of dogmatic, self-righteous authoritarians" within the ranks.

2002 and 2004 Campaigns for State House of Representatives
In both 2002 and 2004, Whitney ran for the Illinois House of Representatives for the 115th District (Carbondale) seat. In 2002 Whitney finished 3rd of 3 running for one seat gaining 2,150 votes for 6% of the total vote. In Whitney's second attempt for elected office he managed 3,859 votes for 8.3% of the total vote.

2006 run for Governor
On June 26, 2006, the Illinois Green Party filed a nominating petition including signatures of more than 39,000 Illinois voters, collected within a 90-day period.  New political parties are required to collect 25,000 signatures within this period to get onto the ballot in Illinois, while established parties need only 5,000 according to state law.  The petition measured approximately 19 inches thick.

According to the Illinois State Board of Elections, within 2 hours of filing, a copy of the petition was requested by Mike Kasper, General Counsel and Treasurer of the Democratic Party of Illinois, at 6:00pm.  One week later, on July 3, objections to the petition were filed, claiming that many of the signatures were not genuine or did not belong to registered voters.

Green Party officials stated that the objections seemed to have been made at random, without actual examination of any records.  The objections included signatures that the Greens had already crossed out; and in some cases objections were made to the 11th signature on a page, even though each page contained only 10 signatures.  Even Whitney's own signature on the petition was challenged.

The hearing process involved 12 or more election judges consistently working full-time for several weeks.  Each party also provided a matching number of members to sit with the election judges, during the workday, as they examined thousands of signatures, either overruling or sustaining each objection.  Objections were assumed valid, and automatically sustained, unless a Green Party representative was present before each election judge to compare signatures and present a defense.

Following the hearing, the State Board of Elections' Hearing Officer, Barbara Goodman, recommended that the Green Party's candidates be placed on the ballot and stated that the case was "extremely straightforward."  The Board's examination confirmed that the Greens collected thousands more than the required number of signatures for ballot access.

On Election Day, Whitney ran third, receiving, 361,336 votes for 10.4%. Incumbent Governor Rod Blagojevich won the election, receiving 1,736,731 votes, for 49.8%. State Treasurer Judy Baar Topinka ran second, with 1,369,315 votes for 39.3%.

By receiving more than 5% of the total vote, Whitney's candidacy allowed the Green Party to become an established political party statewide, according to Illinois state election law. This status provided the party with several new advantages, such as lower signature requirements for ballot access, primary elections, free access to additional voter data, the ability to elect precinct committeemen, run a partial slate of candidates at any jurisdictional level, and slate candidates without petitioning. The only other statewide established political parties are the Democratic and Republican parties. It is rare for a new political party to become established statewide in Illinois, the last to do so being the Solidarity Party in 1986 and the Progressive Party before that.

2010 run for Governor
On July 15, 2009, Whitney announced his candidacy for the Green Party's nomination for governor in 2010.

Whitney's campaign platform included raising income taxes, lowering  property taxes, legalizing and taxing marijuana, and putting a tax on some of the trades at the Chicago Mercantile Exchange and Chicago Board Options Exchange.  Whitney said even a tiny tax on the billions of dollars traded on the Exchange could amount to big money for the state. In a March 2010 interview, Whitney stated,  "I think most people in Illinois are actually in favor of an income tax increase."

Like California Green Party gubernatorial candidate Laura Wells, Whitney also proposed putting state tax revenues and pension contributions into a state bank.  In a March 11, 2010, article in The Nation, Whitney said, "Instead of using state funds as a means to further enrich private banks, a state-owned bank could earn additional revenue for the state while at the same time help spur economic development in Illinois."

According to a poll conducted from June 12–13, Whitney was at 9%, and by August a poll showed that 11%  of respondents approved of him. But a poll in September showed a decline to 8%, and by late October his numbers were as low as 4%. (Poll results are summarized in the article Illinois gubernatorial election, 2010.)

Whitney called for open debates to include all candidates, and stated in an interview:

"The idea of debate is to get all of the points of view on the table, and let the voters decide," Whitney said. "I'm very happy to put my ideas to the test of more than just two opponents. Again, I think the public is the winner when that happens."

In October 2010, CBS News reported that Whitney's name was misspelled on electronic ballots as "Rich Whitey". The problem affected 20 Chicago wards that were predominantly African-American. It was estimated that 10% of all votes would be cast electronically.

Results in the 2010 election showed that Whitney
finished with 99,625 votes (2.7% of the total), placing fourth: ahead of Libertarian Lex Green but behind Scott Lee Cohen, who ran as an Independent.

See also
 Illinois Green Party
 Green Party of the United States
 Illinois gubernatorial election, 2006
 Illinois gubernatorial election, 2010

References
Notes

Sources
 Rockford Register Star endorsement
 Southwest News-Herald endorsement
 State School News Service endorsement
 Whitney letter of resignation from SLP p.97-99
 SLP leader "outs" Whitney
 Candidate confirms past Socialist ties

External links

Whitney for Governor (Official Website)
Rich Whitney for Governor on MySpace
A look at Rich Whitney, Green Party candidate for governor
"Don't Fear the Spoiler: Why it's (probably) safe to vote Green for governor" (Chicago Reader, Oct. 2006)
"The Five Percent Rule" (Conscious Choice, Oct. 2006)
Rich Whitney Illinois Green Party Gubernational Candidate Speaking at a press conference during the 2008 Green National Convention
Rich Whitney, Green Party Governor Candidate, Announces Budget Proposals (Huffington Post, March 11, 2010)

1955 births
Living people
Illinois lawyers
Illinois Greens
Michigan State University alumni
People from Carbondale, Illinois
Politicians from Bridgeport, Connecticut
Southern Illinois University School of Law alumni
Socialist Labor Party of America politicians from Illinois
Lawyers from Bridgeport, Connecticut